William Venturini (born February 14, 1953), nicknamed "Big Bill", is a retired American professional stock car racing driver. He is the founder and co-owner of Venturini Motorsports, a team that competes in the ARCA Menards Series. As a driver, he primarily competed in the same series from 1982 through 1996. Venturini has won two ARCA championships, which came in 1987 and 1991.

Career

Driving career
As a driver, "Big Bill" Venturini made his ARCA Series debut in 1982. In 1983, Venturini won his first ARCA race at Flat Rock Speedway and at the end of the season he became rookie of the year and finished runner-up to Bob Dotter. Venturini backed up this performance by finishing runner-up in 1984 and 1985. After finishing third in 1986 Venturini won his first ARCA championship in 1987. After finishing fourth in the 1988 season Venturini scaled down and only ran a part-time schedule in 1989 and 1990. Venturini won his second ARCA championship in 1991 after a consistent season. He finished third in 1992 and sixth in his last full-time season in 1994. Venturini made his last ARCA Racing Series start at the season finale at Atlanta in 1996. During his ARCA Racing Series career Venturini set the all-time qualifying records at Daytona International Speedway and Talladega Superspeedway.

Venturini made thirteen NASCAR starts across all three national series. He made his Winston Cup Series debut at Michigan International Speedway in 1989. In his seven Cup Series starts, his best finish was eighteenth at the 1990 Winston 500 at Talladega Superspeedway. Venturini attempted to qualify for the Daytona 500 in 1990 and 1991 but failed to qualify on both occasions.

Team owner career

Bill, his wife Cathy, and his son Billy, also a retired driver, are the co-owners of Venturini Motorsports, a team which competes full-time with three cars in the ARCA Menards Series (Nos. 15, 20, 25) as well as one part-time car (the No. 55). They have competed in that series for decades to much success. In 2020, they began fielding teams in the ARCA Menards Series East (the No. 20 part-time and the No. 25 full-time) and West (one car part-time).

It has been a tradition since 2006 for "Big Bill" to kiss one of his drivers in victory lane if they win a race. The first time he did it was when Billy was still competing in ARCA as a driver and won an ARCA race at Salem that year, and they continued it in 2007 when the Venturini's turned their team into a driver development team.

Personal life
Venturini was born in Chicago, Illinois, as the son of Tony Venturini, an amateur racing driver who began his stock car racing career at the historic Soldier Field, also in Chicago. His father competed against NASCAR drivers such as Tom Pistone and Fred Lorenzen. Venturini's wife Cathy was part of his pit crew during his championship winning season in 1987. His son Billy also became a racing driver and competed in the ARCA Racing Series from 1994 through 2007. His daughter Wendy currently works in NASCAR as a radio reporter for the Performance Racing Network and formerly on TV for Speed and Fox as well.

Motorsports career results

NASCAR
(key) (Bold – Pole position awarded by qualifying time. Italics – Pole position earned by points standings or practice time. * – Most laps led.)

Winston Cup Series

Daytona 500

Busch Series

Craftsman Truck Series

ARCA Bondo/Mar-Hyde Series
(key) (Bold – Pole position awarded by qualifying time. Italics – Pole position earned by points standings or practice time. * – Most laps led.)

References

External links

 
 

1953 births
Living people
Racing drivers from Chicago
NASCAR drivers
ARCA Menards Series drivers
NASCAR team owners